Out of My League may refer to:

 Out of My League (song), a song recorded by American band Fitz and the Tantrums
 Out of My League (film), a 2020 Italian romantic comedy-drama film by Alice Filippi